Kenneth Edward Macha (born September 29, 1950) is a former Major League Baseball third baseman and manager. He managed the Oakland Athletics from 2003–2006, including American League Western Division championships in both his first and final seasons with the team, and later managed the Milwaukee Brewers (2009–10).

Previously, Macha played for the Pittsburgh Pirates, Montreal Expos and Toronto Blue Jays in a span of six seasons from 1974–1981. He was a first cousin to Hal Newhouser. In the offseason, he lives in Murrysville, Pennsylvania, with his family. Macha frequently appears on Root Sports Pittsburgh as a postgame analyst for the Pirates.

Playing career
Macha is a graduate of Gateway High School in Monroeville, a suburb of Pittsburgh, and played college ball at the University of Pittsburgh. He was selected by Pittsburgh in the sixth round of the 1972 June draft. He was the Eastern League batting champion in 1974 with the Thetford Mines Pirates.

Macha made his major league debut on September 14, 1974, going 1-for-1 in a 17-2 Pirates loss to the Expos at Jarry Park. He is one of only a handful of players to play for both the Montreal Expos and Toronto Blue Jays, Canada's two major league franchises. His last major league appearance was on September 30, 1981 in a 3-0 Blue Jays loss to the Oakland Athletics. Macha hit a combined .258 in 180 Major League Baseball games.

Following his major league career, Macha spent four years playing in Japan with the Chunichi Dragons, from 1982 until 1985.

Coaching career
Macha retired as a player in 1985 and joined the Expos as a major league coach in 1986. He spent six seasons at Montreal before moving to coaching for the California Angels at bullpen and third base. He then joined the Boston Red Sox organization in fall 1994.

The 1997 season marked Macha's first as manager of the Triple-A Pawtucket Red Sox. In the previous two seasons he managed the Double-A Trenton Thunder to first-place finishes, including a league-best 86–56 record and another division crown in 1996. He was chosen to manage the American League affiliates in the Double-A All-Star Game.

Macha then joined the Oakland Athletics as bench coach, serving under former Pirates teammate Art Howe from 1999 through 2002. In March 2002, the A's denied permission for the Red Sox to contact Macha about their managerial vacancy. Boston then hired Grady Little, while Macha spent a final season as a coach until he was tapped to succeed Howe, who became manager of the New York Mets after the season ended.

In one of the most unusual contract moves ever, Macha's pact expired on October 8, 2005 and negotiations broke down between the two sides trying to reach a deal; eventually it broke apart and Macha was out of a job. Six days later—apparently after talking with the Pittsburgh Pirates, but either not being offered the managerial position there or deciding not to take it—Macha reached a deal with the Athletics and became manager once again. He would lead them to a division title and a sweep over the Minnesota Twins in the ALDS to advance to the American League Championship Series, which was the team's first playoff series victory since 1990. However, the Athletics would be swept by the Detroit Tigers. On October 16, 2006, he was fired by general manager Billy Beane, which occurred the same day that a report came out by ESPN that cited Macha having a tenuous relationship with the players, particularly with injured players (he referred to two places on the disabled list as "non-entities").  The Athletics would not win another playoff series until 2020.

After he was dismissed from his managerial position in Oakland, the Seattle Mariners offered Macha a position as bench coach to manager Mike Hargrove, but Macha refused, citing his desire to take a year off. He was then offered a position as a senior adviser to Mariners GM Bill Bavasi. However, in April 2007, Macha accepted a part-time position as a pre- and post-game analyst for New England Sports Network, which telecasts Boston Red Sox games.

On October 30, 2008, the Milwaukee Brewers announced Macha as the Brewers' new manager. Macha's Brewers finished below .500 in both 2009 and 2010. On October 3, 2010, it was confirmed that Macha would not return for the 2011 season.

Retirement
As of 2020, Macha is retired and residing in Latrobe, PA, near his hometown of Monroeville.

Managerial record

See also

References

External links

Ken Macha at Pura Pelota (Venezuelan Professional Baseball League)

1950 births
Living people
American expatriate baseball players in Canada
American expatriate baseball players in Japan
Baseball coaches from Pennsylvania
Baseball players from Pennsylvania
California Angels coaches
Charleston Charlies players
Chunichi Dragons players
Columbus Clippers players
Denver Bears players
Major League Baseball broadcasters
Major League Baseball bench coaches
Major League Baseball bullpen coaches
Major League Baseball third basemen
Milwaukee Brewers managers
Montreal Expos coaches
Montreal Expos players
Navegantes del Magallanes players
American expatriate baseball players in Venezuela
Nippon Professional Baseball first basemen
Nippon Professional Baseball third basemen
Oakland Athletics coaches
Oakland Athletics managers
Pawtucket Red Sox managers
People from Monroeville, Pennsylvania
People from Westmoreland County, Pennsylvania
Pittsburgh Panthers baseball players
Pittsburgh Pirates players
Salem Pirates players
Sherbrooke Pirates players
Thetford Mines Pirates players
Toronto Blue Jays players
Trenton Thunder managers
University of Pittsburgh alumni